The unnamed Vilatte seminary at Sturgeon Bay was a proposed Old Catholic seminary to be located in Sturgeon Bay, Wisconsin. It is known for changing local public opinion about Joseph René Vilatte.

History
In March 1887, Vilatte, pastor of the Precious Blood mission, visited The Independent newspaper office, in Sturgeon Bay, and informed the newspaper that: he had solicited funds for building a seminary and "secured several thousand dollars for commencing the work", plans were being made in Chicago, Illinois, furnishings were secured, and "construction will be commenced in June". He was asked about his order and responded that the "order has a large number of adherents" in Europe and "is doubling every three years" in some of those countries. Curiously, the article did not mention the name of the order. In April, the Door County Advocate reported Vilatte visited Sturgeon Bay on 1887-04-25 to obtain a suitable location for the establishment of a college of his order. Although months earlier Vilatte said "construction will be commenced in June", by the end of May, the Door County Advocate reported, only that, he had "signified his willingness to establish a seminary in this city provided our people see fit to donate the required real estate", and that, a benefactor, who "will give the society other material aid if it is necessary to secure the institution for this city", donated  of land. In July, land "which has been purchased by the donations of our citizens" for the college, was transferred and work was to start on buildings in September. The next day the city council permitted "himself and family" to reside in a vacant school building; he was to operate a school in that building until his seminary was completed. In October, he began visiting cities along the East Coast of the United States "in quest of funds with which to erect the proposed seminary." He was away for several months. But a week after his return from touring the East Coast of the United States, Vilatte shocked Sturgeon Bay. His "contemplated seminary" would not be established there but elsewhere, wrote The Independent, in an article titled "Can this be true?" which exasperated that, "[t]he reasons given for this change are so extraordinary that we are not prepared to accept the statements made without further testimony." Vilatte wrote to Chris Leonhardt, President of the Business Men's Association, the group which facilitated the land purchase and aided him, that,

His letter was seen as a deleterious depiction of their community. The Independent editorialized,

Brown died within weeks of Vilatte's announcement, on 1888-05-02.

By 1889, Vilatte's scheme was apparent and he was seen as a scoundrel. The Door County Advocate wrote,

Emma de Beaumont, wife of Father Ernest, the Episcopal priest who had assisted Vilatte since 1887, wrote to the Door County Advocate that, regardless whatever Vilatte had said, nothing had been done "toward building a college elsewhere" since Brown's death "upset whatever may have been the plan".

This project was never carried out, and the land was returned to the donors.

Notes

References

Door County, Wisconsin
History of Wisconsin
Old Catholicism in the United States
Christianity in Wisconsin